Belvidere Historic District may refer to:

 Belvidere Historic District (Hertford, North Carolina), on the National Register of Historic Places
 Belvidere Historic District (Belvidere, New Jersey), on the National Register of Historic Places

See also 
 Belvidere Hill Historic District, Lowell, Massachusetts, on the National Register of Historic Places
 Belvidere (disambiguation)